Adigoppula is a village in Palnadu district of the Indian state of Andhra Pradesh. It is located in Durgi mandal of Gurazala revenue division, and the distance from Adigoppila to Gurazala is 23 kilometers. The Gram Panchayat is Adigoppula. The mandal headquarters is Durgi, and the distance from Adigoppula to Durgi is 9 kilometers. The district headquarters is Guntur, and the distance from Adigoppula to Guntur is 99 kilometers. The nearest towns are Macherla and karempudi, and the distance from Adigoppula to Macherla is 22 kilometers. Adigoppula's pincode is 522612.

Geography 

Governance 
Adigoppula gram panchayat is the local self-government of the village. It is divided into wards and each ward is represented by a ward member.

Education 

As per the school information report for the academic year 2018–19, the village has one private and three MPP schools.

References 

Villages in Palnadu district